"Power of American Natives" (sometimes also spelled as "P.ower of A.merican N.atives") is a song by German techno duo Dance 2 Trance, featuring vocals by USA-born, Germany-based singer Linda Rocco. Released in 1992 as the third single from their first album, Moon Spirits (1992), it is their most commercially successful single, and now widely considered as a classic of its genre. It peaked within the top 10 in Austria, Belgium, Finland, Germany, the Netherlands, Norway and Spain. In the UK, it reached top 30, peaking at number 25, but fared even better on the dance chart, peaking at number three. The single sold 250,000 records and was awarded a gold disc. A video was made and reached the mainstream networks such as MTV. 

In 1998, the song was released in a new remix by DJ Quicksilver, charting in Austria, Germany and Sweden. Also in 1997 and 2009, remixes were released.

Background and release
In the 2020 book Move Your Body (2 The 90s): Unlimited Eurodance by Juha Soininen, singer Linda Rocco told about making the song, "I had been working for a long time already with Rolf Elmer (Jam el Mar) and one day he asked if I would be interested in singing on Dance 2 Trance's new song. They had already released Power Of American Natives as an instrumental but didn't have much success with it. I then wrote the spoken verses, sang the hook, and the rest is history." She added, "And yes, people know exactly who I am on this song. It is still played numerous times a day around the world!!"

Chart performance
"Power of American Natives" was successful on the singles chart across Europe. It peaked at number two in the Netherlands in June 1993, as well as on the European Dance Radio Chart in July same year, being kept from the number one position by Janet Jackson's "That's the Way Love Goes". On the Dutch Top 40, the song peaked at the next best position for two weeks, being held off the top spot by Haddaway's "What Is Love". "Power of American Natives" entered the top 10 also in Austria (7), Belgium (10), Finland (3), Germany (9), Norway (5) and Spain (9). In the UK, it reached number 25 on the UK Singles Chart, but was more successful on the UK Dance Singles Chart, peaking at number three. Additionally, the single was a top 20 hit in Denmark (12), Ireland (16), Sweden (15) and Switzerland (11), as well as on the Eurochart Hot 100, where it hit number 13 in May 1993. In France, it entered the top 50.

Critical reception
In his weekly UK chart commentary, James Masterton wrote, "Another dance hit that crosses over having finally been released, this could well make a big impact on the chart in future having already picked up a great deal of radio airplay even before its release, which probably prompted this relatively strong new entry." Andy Beevers from Music Week gave the song three out of five, describing it as a "trancey tribute to American Indians". He added that "with its nice pan pipe samples and exclusive UK remix by Jam & Spoon, it is now getting plenty of club exposure here and should sell well." James Hamilton from the RM Dance Update viewed it as an "Andean pan-pipes tootled trancey Hi-NRG galloper".

Track listing

 12", Germany (1992)
"P.ower of A.merican N.atives" (Vocal Mix) – 6:34
"P.ower of A.merican N.atives" (Ethno Instrumental Mix) – 5:57
"P.ower of A.merican N.atives" (Airplay Edit) – 3:51

 CD single, the Netherlands (1992)
"Power of American Natives" (Airplay Edit) – 3:52
"Power of American Natives" (Vocal Mix) – 6:34

 CD maxi, Germany (1992)
"Power of American Natives" (Airplay Edit) – 3:52
"Power of American Natives" (Vocal Mix) – 6:34
"Power of American Natives" (Ethno Instrumental Mix) – 5:57

Charts

Weekly charts

Year-end charts

References

1992 singles
1998 singles
1996 songs
Blow Up singles
Dance Pool singles
English-language German songs
Logic Records singles
Techno songs
Trance songs